Dunkard may refer to:

 
 Dunkard Township, Greene County, Pennsylvania – administrative territorial subdivision in the United States
 Dunkard Creek – stream in Greene County, Pennsylvania and Monongalia County, West Virginia